876 Scott is a minor planet orbiting the Sun. For a long time, its name had been falsely attributed to Robert Falcon Scott. In fact, it was named after discoverer Johann Palisa's financial supporter Miss E. Scott.

References

External links
 
 

000876
Discoveries by Johann Palisa
Named minor planets
000876
19170620